Placitas is a census-designated place in Doña Ana County, New Mexico, United States. Its population was 576 as of the 2010 census. The community is along the western border of Hatch.

Geography

Education
It is zoned to Hatch Valley Public Schools.

References

Census-designated places in New Mexico
Census-designated places in Doña Ana County, New Mexico